Josh Hoge is an American songwriter from Franklin, Tennessee, United States. Named SESAC Songwriter of the year in 2016, Hoge has penned hit singles for Chris Young such as "Think of You", and "I'm Comin' Over" along with charting singles for Kane Brown like "Used to Love You Sober" and "Thunder in the Rain".

Songwriting discography

References

Songwriters from Tennessee
Living people
Year of birth missing (living people)